The 2018–19 season was Brentford's 129th year in existence and fifth consecutive season in the Championship. Along with competing in the Championship, the club also participated in the FA Cup and the EFL Cup.

The season covers the period from 1 July 2018 to 30 June 2019 and was their penultimate at Griffin Park.

Transfers

Transfers in

Loans in

Transfers out

Loans out

Released

Results

Pre-season and friendlies

Championship

League table

Results summary

 Source: Sports Mole

Result by matchday

Matches

FA Cup

EFL Cup

 Source: Soccerbase

First team squad

 Players' ages are as of the opening day of the 2018–19 season.

Statistics

Appearances and goals
Substitute appearances in brackets.

Maximum 45 league appearances in season
Players listed in italics left the club mid-season
 Source: Soccerbase

Goalscorers 

Players listed in italics left the club mid-season
 Source: Soccerbase

Discipline 

 Players listed in italics left the club mid-season.
 Source: ESPN

International caps

Coaching staff

Dean Smith (4 August – 10 October 2018)

Thomas Frank (16 October 2018 – 5 May 2019) 

Sources: brentfordfc.com, brentfordfc.com

Kit

|
|

Awards
Supporters' Player of the Year: Neal Maupay
Players' Player of the Year: Neal Maupay
London Football Awards Player of the Year: Neal Maupay
EFL Championship Goal of the Month: Saïd Benrahma (February 2019)

References

Brentford
Brentford F.C. seasons